Disley is a village in the Canadian province of Saskatchewan within the Rural Municipality of Lumsden No. 189 and Census Division No. 6.

History 
Disley incorporated as a village on June 24, 1907.

Demographics 

See also 

 List of communities in Saskatchewan
 Villages of Saskatchewan
 Disley

References

Villages in Saskatchewan
Lumsden No. 189, Saskatchewan
Division No. 6, Saskatchewan